Events from the year 1926 in Italy.

Kingdom of Italy
 Monarch – Victor Emmanuel III (1900–1946)
 Prime Minister – Benito Mussolini

Events
 April 7 – Fascist leader Benito Mussolini survives an attempt on his life by the Irishwoman Violet Gibson.
 1 August: the football team is founded SSC Napoli, the team is all today one of the best in Italy, with 2 league titles, 4 Italian cups, 2 Italian super cups, and an uefa cup, also from 1984 to 1991 it was the team of Diego Armando Maradona.
 September 5 – The Italian Grand Prix is held at Monza and won by Louis Charavel.
 September 19 – The Giuseppe Meazza (San Siro) Stadium is officially opened in Milan.

Births
 January 1 – Claudio Villa, singer (died 1987)
 January 8 – Lazzaro Donati, artist (died 1977)
 January 26 – Franco Evangelisti, composer (died 1980)
 February 23 – Luigi De Magistris, cardinal (died 2022)
 March 26 – Aldo Tarlao, Olympic rower (died 2018)
 May 10 – Pasquale Panìco, politician (died 2018)
 August 14 – Agostino Cacciavillan, cardinal 
 August 18 – Franca Marzi, film actress (died 1989)
 September 2 – Armando Cossutta, communist politician (died 2015)  
 September 18 – Franco Archibugi, political economist (died 2020)
 September 21 – Carla Calò, actress (died 2019)  
 October 7 – Marcello Abbado, composer and pianist (died 2020)  
 November 25 – Ivano Fontana, boxer (died 1993)

Deaths
 January 4 – Margherita of Savoy, Queen consort of Italy (b. 1851)

References

 
1920s in Italy
Italy
Years of the 20th century in Italy